Kolkata Metropolitan Development Authority (KMDA) is the statutory planning and development authority for the Kolkata Metropolitan Area (KMA) in the state of West Bengal, India. The organisation used to be known as Calcutta Metropolitan Development Authority (CMDA) and retains the previous logo. KMDA is functioning under the administrative control of Department of Urban Development and Municipal Affairs of Government of West Bengal.

Functions 
KMDA's role is multi-disciplinary: it is the agency of city planning, it sculpts new areas and townships, it develops physical infrastructure as well as provide basic services like water, drainage, waste management. KMDA is also the Technical Secretariat to Kolkata Metropolitan Planning Committee (KMPC). Besides these major functional areas, KMDA is also engaged in providing consultancy services and implementing projects on behalf of other public sector departments and agencies.

History
The organisation was formed under a Presidential Ordinance in 1970. It works now under provision of the West Bengal Town and Country (Planning & Development) Act, 1979. Its Planning Directorate was set up in 1974.

Governance
KMDA has an 11-member Board that includes both elected peoples' representatives and nominated bureaucrats. The Honourable Minister-in-charge of Urban Development and Municipal Affairs in the Government of West Bengal is the ex-officio Chairman of the Board of KMDA.

Jurisdiction

Notable projects

See also
 Siliguri Jalpaiguri Development Authority

External links
Official KMDA website

References

Organisations based in Kolkata
Government of Kolkata
State urban development authorities of India
State agencies of West Bengal
1970 establishments in West Bengal
Indian companies established in 1970